The following is a list of full-time captains of Leeds Rhinos Rugby League Football Club. In January 2020 Stevie Ward was announced as the captain for the 2018 season. The club's captain previously was Trent Merrin.

Captains

References

Leeds Rhinos